Anne Emery (September 1, 1907 – July 4, 1987) was the writer of popular teen romance novels from 1946 to 1980.

Personal life

Anne Emery, née Anne Eleanor McGuigan, was born Sep 1, 1907 in Fargo, North Dakota. She was raised in Evanston, Illinois, attended Northwestern University, and then taught school in Evanston. She married John Douglas Emery in 1933. They had four daughters and one son. Emery died July 4, 1987, in Menlo Park, California.

Writing career

In 1941, Emery began writing short stories. Her first sale was a 500-word story for $1.25. Her first novel, Tradition, explored the internment of Japanese Americans during World War II through the eyes of a white protagonist. Tradition, which received favorable reviews, was one of four children's books recommended for National Brotherhood Week by the National Conference of Christians and Jews.

Emery went on to write dozens of what were sometimes known as "malt shop novels". In multiple books, Emery addressed the fashion of going steady by exposing the potential negatives of the trend. In Going Steady, she illustrates this through a couple who married too young, the wife pregnant and the husband trapped in a menial job.

Although many of Emery's novels fit the formulaic stereotype of teen romance, the set of novels featuring Dinny Gordon, a high-school student with a passion for archeology, focuses on the growth and development of the title character rather than the machinations of finding a boyfriend. In writing the Dinny Gordon books, Emery is described as a "transitional author", bridging the domestic patterns of the 1950s and the more female career-oriented 1960s. Joyce Litton characterizes the themes of independence, nontraditional career choices, and Dinny's refusal to be obsessed with her appearance as a "harbinger of later feminist critiques". The character Dinny Gordon was unusual at the time in teen fiction for her intellectual passion; for instance, she worked at part-time jobs to save money for a trip to Pompeii rather than for clothes and make-up.

In Free Not to Love, Emery addresses teen-age sex and, rather than showing heavy-handed consequences, has her protagonist reach the conclusion that sex is not a solution to loneliness.

In addition to over 30 teen romance novels, Emery wrote seven historical novels for children. Several of her books were translated into Japanese, one into German, and several were combined into an Italian compilation.

Her manuscripts and correspondence are preserved at the University of Oregon Library (Eugene). In the 2000s, her books were reissued by Image Cascade Publishing.

Reception

Reviewers for the New York Times generally praised Emery's books. Of Mountain Laurel: "An uncommonly good novel for older girls" and "the background, good as it is, never obscures the humanity of the characters". E. L. B., reviewing Sorority Girl, praised Emery for "her usual acute understanding of present-day teen-ager problems". Gerald Raftery declared that her historical novel, A Spy in Old Detroit, was "soundly researched, the story follows the facts faithfully". Phyllis Whitney praised Senior Year for "sound values presented in a way that makes its points without preaching" and added "particularly praiseworthy is the way Anne Emery has handled the matter of drinking among young people." An exception was That Archer Girl, about which the reviewer said that the title character "might well be a good subject for a psychiatric case study, she is too humorless to be an appealing villainess".

Jill Anderson writes that "Emery consistently used the formulaic nature of the junior novel, with its emphasis on personal growth and adjustment, to explore more challenging ethical issues, from cheating to urban and Appalachian poverty to anti-Semitism and prejudice against Nisei internees."

As contrasted to fellow teen romance authors such as Rosamond du Jardin, critics felt Emery's books presented a more realistic presentation of teen love.

While not every novel was favorably received, Richard Alm labeled Emery "a novelist of considerable merit" and described her books as "well-told stories about credible adolescents".

Publication history

References

20th-century American novelists
American women novelists
American writers of young adult literature
American romantic fiction novelists
1907 births
1987 deaths
20th-century American women writers